Viktor Budinský (born 9 May 1993) is a Slovak football goalkeeper who currently plays for FK Pardubice on loan from Baník Ostrava. He previously played for AC Sparta Prague.

FK Dukla Banská Bystrica
Budinský made his official debut for FK Dukla Banská Bystrica on 20 May 2011, playing full-time in a 0–2 away loss against MFK Ružomberok.

References

External links
 FK Dukla Banská Bystrica profile

 Eurofotbal.cz profile

1993 births
Living people
Association football goalkeepers
Slovak footballers
FK Dukla Banská Bystrica players
FC Sellier & Bellot Vlašim players
Bohemians 1905 players
FC Baník Ostrava players
Slovak Super Liga players
Expatriate footballers in the Czech Republic
People from Banská Štiavnica
Sportspeople from the Banská Bystrica Region
Slovakia under-21 international footballers
FK Pardubice players
Czech National Football League players